Believe in Him is a gospel album and 71st overall album by American country singer Johnny Cash, released on Word Records in 1986. It features acoustic arrangements of classic gospel songs.

The tracks were originally recorded in 1982 for a planned album release on the Columbia Records subsidiary label, Priority Records, under the title Johnny Cash - Gospel Singer. This album was cancelled when parent CBS Records shut down Priority, and the tracks remained unreleased until issued as Believe in Him by Word records.

It is notable as the first album of original material to be released by Cash after leaving Columbia Records though, as noted, he originally recorded the tracks for the company. He subsequently signed with Mercury Records.

In 2012, it was released entirely on CD for the first time as part of Bootleg Vol 4: The Soul of Truth, with a different running order which reflected the originally planned running order for the cancelled Johnny Cash - Gospel Singer, and with the addition of four previously unissued outtakes from the recording sessions.

"Belshazzar" had previously been recorded by Cash for Sun Records. The album featured the Cathedral Quartet on background vocals.

Track listing

Personnel
 Johnny Cash – vocals, guitar
 Marty Stuart – producer, guitar, mandolin
 Bob Wootton - guitar
 Earl "Poole" Ball – piano
 Hargus "Pig" Robbins – piano
 Bob Whitlock – synthesizer, organ
 David Briggs – synthesizer, organ
 Jack Grochmal – pump organ
 W. S. Holland – drums
 Kenny Malone – drums
 Jimmy Tittle – bass
 Bob Wray – bass
 Roy Huskey, Jr. – bass
 T. Michael Coleman – bass
 Joe Allen – bass
 Peter Drake – steel guitar
 The Cathedral Quartet – guest vocalist
 Jessie Colter – guest vocals on "Rugged Old Cross"
 Mike Leech – string arrangements

References

External links
 Luma Electronic's Johnny Cash discography listing

Johnny Cash albums
1986 albums
Gospel albums by American artists